, born , was a Japanese rock musician, lyricist, composer, musical producer, and actor from Tokyo, Japan. He was dubbed "Japan's King of Rock". He formed and led the influential rock band RC Succession. He wrote many anti-nuclear songs following the Chernobyl disaster in 1986. He was known for pioneering the adoption of linguistic characteristics of the Japanese language into his songs.

Biography 
Kiyoshiro was born in Nakano, Tokyo, Japan in 1951. While in high school, he formed a cover band named the Clovers in 1966. The band dissolved a year later, and he then formed RC Succession in 1968, which debuted on the music scene in 1970.

In 1982, Kiyoshiro collaborated with Ryuichi Sakamoto and released the single "Ikenai Rouge Magic" which became a top hit on the Oricon chart.

After RC Succession ceased to perform and record in 1991, Kiyoshiro continued as a solo singer. He recorded and performed under various unit names apart from his own such as Danger, Razor Sharp, HIS, 2 3's, Ruffy Tuffy, Mitsukiyo and Screaming Revue. With groups the Timers and Love Jets, Kiyoshiro remained anonymous using pseudonyms and fictitious characters.

In 1992, he released the album Memphis which was recorded in Memphis with Booker T. & the M.G.'s. At the time of the recording, he received an honorary citizenship from the Mayor of Memphis. Following the release of the album, Kiyoshiro toured Japan with the M.G.'s, and the Budokan concert of that tour was released on the live album Have Mercy!.

Kiyoshiro also dubbed the voice of the Lord Royal Highness of Atlantis in the Japanese version of "SpongeBob's Atlantis SquarePantis" on Nickelodeon Japan Channel. (However, on NHK Educational TV he is voiced by voice actor Yoshito Yasuhara instead.)

On July 3, 2006, Kiyoshiro confessed on his official website that he was diagnosed with throat cancer and canceled all the concerts to focus on the treatment. He made a comeback in January the following year announcing that he won the battle with cancer, however, it was revealed in July that it had spread to the left ilium, resulting in a cancellation of all shows again.

Death 
On May 2, 2009, Kiyoshiro died of cancer. His funeral took place at Aoyama Sougisho on May 9, 2009. Approximately 42,000 fans visited to bid farewell, the same amount that attended Hibari Misora's funeral held at the same place. The funeral ceremony was titled The Aoyama Rock n' Roll Show and Kiyoshiro's band played in front of 1,000 people including Keisuke Kuwata, Shinobu Otake, Naoto Takenaka.

Posthumous release 
On June 17, 2009, the single "Oh! Radio" which is said to be Kiyoshiro's last recorded work was released. This song was written by Kiyoshiro as the campaign song for the Osaka radio station FM802 and originally sung by Shikao Suga and Shigeru Kishida of Quruli under the unit name of Radio Soul 20. The version sung by Kiyoshiro was recorded all by himself (playing guitar, bass, drums and harmonica) at his studio "Rock n' Roll Kenkyujo" sometime in early 2009, and was intended as a demo. It was first made public at his funeral, and it was decided to be released following the overwhelming demand from the fans.

Memorial Concert 
Because Kiyoshiro was a popular performer at Japan's Fuji Rock Festival, there was a major tribute concert to his life and work held at Fuji Rock 2009, which was held two months after his death in July 2009. The Fuji Rock tribute featured many famous Japanese and international artists speaking about Imawano and singing either his songs or their own in memory of him. Some of the artists performing at the memorial included: Chara, UA, Booker T. Jones, Steve Cropper, Leyona, Hiroto Kōmoto, Masatoshi Mashima, Tortoise Matsumoto, Hamazaki Takashi, YO-KING, Char, Reichi Nakaido, Wilko Johnson, Norman Watt-Roy, and Shigeru Izumiya.

Discography 
For RC Succession discography, please see RC Succession discography

   1982   Dr. Umezu & Kiyoshiro / Danger
   1985   Danger II
   1987   Razor Sharp
   1987   Kiyoshiro Imawano & The Razor Sharp / Happy Heads
   1989   The Timers / The Timers
   1991   HIS / Nippon no Hito (unit with Haruomi Hosono and Fuyumi Sakamoto)
   1992   Memphis
   1992   Kiyoshiro Imawano + Booker T. & the M.G.'s / Have Mercy! 
   1992   Kiyoshiro Imawano & 2 3's / Go Go 2 3's
   1993   Kiyoshiro Imawano & 2 3's / Music From Power House
   1994   Magic
   1994   Kiyoshiro Imawano & Reichi Nakaido / Glad All Over
   1995   The Timers / Fukkatsu!! The Timers
   1995   The Timers / Fujimi no Timers
   1997   Kiyoshiro meets de-ga-show  / Hospital
   1997   Kiyoshiro Imawano Little Screaming Revue / Groovin' Time
   1998   Kiyoshiro Imawano Little Screaming Revue / Rainbow Cafe
   1999   Ruffy Tuffy
   1999   Kiyoshiro Imawano Little Screaming Revue / Fuyu no Jujika
   2000   Ruffy Tuffy / Natsu no Jujika
   2000   Ruffy Tuffy / Aki no Jujika
   2003   Love Jets / Chinguro
   2003   King
   2005   God
   2006   Yumesuke
   2008   Kanzen Fukkatsusai – Nippon Budokan Live Album
   2008   Wanted Tour 2003–2004
   2009   Aoyama Rock'n'Roll Show 2009.5.9 Original Soundtrack
   2010   Baby #1

Filmography 
 1986 Death Powder ... Dr. Loo
 2001 The Happiness of the Katakuris ... Richâdo Sagawa
 2002 Chicken Heart ... Sada
 2002 "Power and Terror: Noam Chomsky in Our Times"
 2003 1980
 2004 Otakus in Love
 2005 The Great Yokai War ... General Nurarihyon
 2008 Then Summer Came

References

External links 

 Kiyoshiro Official homepage 
 
 Kiyoshiro Imawano at Nippop

1951 births
2009 deaths
Deaths from cancer in Japan
Japanese male actors
Japanese male rock singers
Japanese male singer-songwriters
Singers from Tokyo
Japanese anti–nuclear power activists
20th-century Japanese male singers
20th-century Japanese singers